Setchfield Lake is a lake in the U.S. state of Washington.

Setchfield Lake was named Daniel Setchfield, a local educator.

References

Lakes of Thurston County, Washington